Lawrence A. Kirschling (died February 15, 2003) was an American football player and coach. He served as the head football coach at Saint Francis University in Loretto, Pennsylvania in 1948.

Kirschlingwas a graduate of Villanova University and played college football at Duquesne University in Pittsburgh.

References

Year of birth missing
2003 deaths
Duquesne Dukes football players
Saint Francis Red Flash football coaches
High school football coaches in New Jersey
Villanova University alumni
People from Hibbing, Minnesota
Players of American football from Minnesota